The 2014 Dutch Artistic Gymnastics Championships took place in Rotterdam from 21-22 June.

Medalists

References 

2014
2014 in European sport
2014 in gymnastics
International gymnastics competitions hosted by the Netherlands
2014 in Dutch sport